Larry Santos is the fourth studio album by American pop singer and songwriter, Larry Santos, released on Casablanca Records in 1975. The album includes the song "We Can't Hide it Anymore" which reached number 36 on the Billboard Hot 100 pop song chart. it also features the Christian pop single, which is mainly all about Father God touching a newborn child and inspiring him with Christian love on an early sunrise, called, "Early in the Morning".

Track listing
 "Early in the Morning" 	
 "Call Me Janis"
 "We Can't Hide it Anymore" 
 "Can't Get You Off My Mind"
 "Meet Me Tonight"
 "Jon Jon McAllister"
 "Wanting What You Can't Have (Having What You Don't Want)"
 "Long, Long Time"
 "Devil-Eyed Woman"
 "Lover"

Notes

Track 1 is originally "Early in the Mornin'"

Personnel

 Richard Allen, Roger Hawkins – Drums
 Carl Austin, John Trudell – String & Horn Arrangements
 Barry Beckett, Rudy Robinson, Larry Santos, Earl Van Dyke – Keyboards
 Roderick Chandler, David Hood – Bass
 Don Davis – Arranger
 Bobby Eaton – Background Vocal Arrangement
 Eli Fountain – Saxophone on "Lover"
 Eddie Hinton, Jimmy Johnson, Robert White, Eddie Willis – Guitar
 Wade Marcus – Arranger
 Jeff Steinberg – Arranger
 David Van DePitte – Arranger
 Honey – Background Vocals

Charts

External links 

 Retrieved November 22, 2013.

1975 albums
Larry Santos albums
Albums arranged by Wade Marcus
Albums produced by Don Davis (record producer)
Casablanca Records albums
Pop albums by American artists
Easy listening albums